Karin Gambal is a former Austrian Paralympic athlete. She represented Austria at the 1988 Summer Paralympics held in Seoul, South Korea and she won two bronze medals: in the women's 100 m A4A9 and women's 200 m A4A9 events.

References

External links 
 

Living people
Year of birth missing (living people)
Place of birth missing (living people)
Paralympic athletes of Austria
Athletes (track and field) at the 1988 Summer Paralympics
Paralympic bronze medalists for Austria
Medalists at the 1988 Summer Paralympics
Paralympic medalists in athletics (track and field)
Austrian female sprinters
Paralympic sprinters
Sprinters with limb difference
20th-century Austrian women
21st-century Austrian women